Esther Ferrer (born 1937 in San Sebastián, Spain) is a Spanish performance artist. Ferrer received Spain's National Award for Plastic Arts (1999), the Marie-Claire Prize for Contemporary Art in France, and the Velázquez Plastic Arts Prize.

History and career 
In 1966 she joined Walter Marchetti and Juan Hidalgo Codorniu in the Spanish performance art group Zaj, famous for its radical and conceptual performances, whose controversial "concerts" were presented in Spanish concert halls despite the censorship of Franco's regime. Zaj also performed in many other countries for 30 years, until 1996, when the group broke up after a retrospective in the Reina Sofia Museum in Madrid.

As a performer she has participated in festivals in Canada, Korea, the United States and Japan, and throughout Europe (France, Italy, Holland Belgium, Bulgaria, Switzerland, England, the Czech Republic, Poland, Denmark, Norway, Slovakia, Germany and Hungary). Her production also includes objects, photos, video pieces, visual systems based on prime numbers, and a large collection of self-portraits in many media.

Ferrer is the author of two radio productions made for Radio Nacional de España (Au rhythm du temps and Ta, te, ti, to, tu ou l'agriculture dans le Moyen Age) and has given seminars on the performance arts in Universities and in Schools of Fine Arts in Spain, France, Italy, Canada, Switzerland and Mexico.

Ferrer represented Spain in the Venice Bienal in 1999, and did large individual shows in subsequent years in the FRAC Bretagne (Rennes, France), MACVAL (Val de Marne, France), and with the Instituto Cervantes in several South American cities. In autumn 2022 opened a solo retrospective exhibit in Opelvillen Rüsselsheim, as part of Spain being guest of honour at Frankfurt book fair 2022.  In September 2022, Esther Ferrer was the recipient of the Prix international de Littérature Bernard Heidsieck Prix d'honneur awarded by Centre Pompidou and Archivio Conz. 

She is married to minimalist composer Tom Johnson.

References

External links
 Archivio Conz
 Esther Ferrer: Works and Process  Two-part documentary series on Esther Ferrer
 FONS AUDIO #1: Esther Ferrer A podcast on the artist and the Zaj Group
 Official Esther Ferrer Website.

1936 births
Living people
Spanish contemporary artists
Interdisciplinary artists
20th-century Spanish women artists
21st-century Spanish women artists